Ilay Tamam (born 7 May 2001) is an Israeli footballer who plays as a midfielder for Hapoel Rishon LeZion.

Career

Tamam started his career with Israeli top flight side Hapoel Tel Aviv, where he made 14 appearances and scored 0 goals. On 30 May 2020, Tamam debuted for Hapoel Tel Aviv during a 2–1 win over Maccabi Haifa. In 2021, he was sent on loan to Hapoel Petah Tikva in the Israeli second tier.

On 5 September 2022, Tamam went viral on the internet after celebrating a goal by taking off his shirt, which revealed an image of his recently dead dog.

References

External links
 

2001 births
Living people
Israeli footballers
Footballers from Rishon LeZion
Hapoel Petah Tikva F.C. players
Hapoel Rishon LeZion F.C. players
Hapoel Tel Aviv F.C. players
Israeli Premier League players
Liga Leumit players
Israeli people of Tunisian-Jewish descent
Association football midfielders